Hanggin Rear Banner is a banner in the west of the Inner Mongolia Autonomous Region, China. Its administrative center is the town of Shanba (Shenpa).

Climate

Transportation
Hanggin Rear Banner is served by the Linhe-Ceke Railway.

References

External links

Banners of Inner Mongolia
Bayannur